PAMO University of Medical Sciences is a private medical university located in Port Harcourt, Nigeria. The university was established in 2017 as the first private medical university in Nigeria. PAMO University of Medical Sciences was founded by the former governor of Rivers State, Dr Sir Peter Odili. In 2017, the university appointed Former Nigerian Head of State, General Abdulsalami Abubakar, as its Chairman of the Governing Council and Board of Trustees.

Faculties
The university currently have three faculties, namely:-
 Faculty of Clinical Sciences
 Faculty of Basic Medical Sciences
 Faculty of Allied health sciences

References

Educational institutions established in 2017
2017 establishments in Nigeria
Medical schools in Nigeria